The genetic influences of post-traumatic stress disorder are not understood well due to the limitations of any genetic study of mental illness; in that, it cannot be ethically induced in selected groups. Because of this, all studies must use naturally occurring groups with genetic similarities and differences, thus the amount of data is limited. However, genetics play some role in the development of PTSD. Approximately 30% of the variance in PTSD is caused by genetics alone. For twin pairs exposed to combat in Vietnam, having a monozygotic (identical) twin with PTSD was associated with an increased risk of the co-twin's having PTSD compared to twins that were dizygotic (non-identical twins).

Research and potential influences

Genetics plays some role in the development of PTSD. Approximately 30% of the variance in PTSD is caused by genetics alone. For twin pairs exposed to combat in Vietnam, having a monozygotic (identical) twin with PTSD was associated with an increased risk of the co-twin's having PTSD compared to twins that were dizygotic (non-identical twins). There is also evidence that those with a genetically smaller hippocampus are more likely to develop PTSD following a traumatic event. Research has also found that PTSD shares many genetic influences common to other psychiatric disorders. Panic and generalized anxiety disorders and PTSD share 60% of the same genetic variance. Alcohol, nicotine, and drug dependence share greater than 40% genetic similarities.

Gamma-aminobutyric acid (GABA) is the major inhibitory neurotransmitter in the brain. A recent study reported significant interactions between three polymorphisms in the GABA alpha-2 receptor gene and the severity of childhood trauma in predicting PTSD in adults. A study found those with a specific genotype for G-protein signaling 2 (RGS2), a protein that decreases G protein-coupled receptor signaling, and high environmental stress exposure as adults and a diagnosis of lifetime PTSD. This was particularly prevalent in adults with prior trauma exposure and low social support.

Recently, it has been found that several single-nucleotide polymorphisms (SNPs) in FK506 binding protein 5 (FKBP5) interact with childhood trauma to predict severity of adult PTSD. These findings suggest that individuals with these SNPs who are abused as children are more susceptible to PTSD as adults.

This is particularly important given that FKBP5 SNPs have previously been associated with peritraumatic dissociation in medically injured children (that is, dissociation at the time of the childhood trauma), which has itself been shown to be predictive of PTSD. Furthermore, FKBP5 may be less expressed in those with current PTSD. Another recent study found a single SNP in a putative estrogen response element on ADCYAP1R1 (encodes pituitary adenylate cyclase-activating polypeptide type I receptor or PAC1) to predict PTSD diagnosis and symptoms in females. Incidentally, this SNP is also associated with fear discrimination. The study suggests that perturbations in the PACAP-PAC1 pathway are involved in abnormal stress responses underlying PTSD.

PTSD is a psychiatric disorder that requires an environmental event that individuals may have varied responses to. Because of this, gene-environment studies tend to be the most indicative of their effect on the probability of PTSD than studies of the main effect of the gene. Recent studies have demonstrated the interaction between PFBP5 and childhood environment to predict the severity of PTSD. Polymorphisms in FKBP5 have been associated with peritraumatic dissociation in mentally ill children. A study of highly traumatized African-American subjects from inner city primary-care clinics indicated 4 polymorphisms of the FKBP5 gene, each of these functions. The interaction between the polymorphisms and the severity of childhood abuse predicts the severity of adult PTSD symptoms. A more recent study of the African-American population indicated that the TT genotype of the FKBP5 gene is associated with the highest risk of PTSD among those having experienced childhood adversity, however, those with this genotype that experienced no childhood adversity had the lowest risk of PTSD. In addition alcohol dependence interacts with the FKBP5 polymorphisms and childhood adversity to increase the risk of PTSD in these populations. Emergency room expression of the FKPB5 mRNA following trauma was shown to indicate a later development of PTSD.

Catechol-O-methyl transferase (COMT) is an enzyme that catalyzes the extraneuronal breakdown of catecholamines. The gene that codes for COMT has a functional polymorphism in which a valine has been replaced with a methionine at codon 158. This polymorphism has lower enzyme activity and has been tied to a slower breakdown of the catecholamines. A study of Rwandan Genocide survivors indicated that carriers of the Val allele demonstrated the expected response relationship between the higher number of lifetime traumatic events and a lifetime diagnosis of PTSD. However, those with homozygotes for the Met/Met genotype demonstrated a high risk of lifetime PTSD independent of the number of traumatic experiences. Those with Met/Met genotype also demonstrated a reduced extinction of conditioned fear responses with may account for the high risk for PTSD experienced by this genotype.

Many genes impact the limbic-frontal neurocircuitry as a result of its complexity. The main effect of the D2A1 allele of the dopamine receptor D2 (DRD2) has a strong association with the diagnosis of PTSD. The D2A1 allele has also shown a significant association to PTSD in those having engaged in harmful drinking. In addition, a polymorphism in the dopamine transporter SLC6A3 gene has a significant association with chronic PTSD. A polymorphism of the serotonin receptor 2A gene has been associated with PTSD in Korean women. The short allele of the promoter region of the serotonin transporter (5-HTTLPR) has been shown to be less efficient then the long allele and is associated with the amygdala response for the extinction of fear conditioning. However, the short allele is associated with a decreased risk of PTSD in a low-risk environment but a high risk of PTSD in a high-risk environment. The s/s genotype demonstrated a high risk for the development of PTSD even in response to a small number of traumatic events, but those with the l allele demonstrate increased rates of PTSD with increasing traumatic experiences.

Genome-wide association study (GWAS) offer an opportunity to identify novel risk variants for PTSD that will in turn inform our understanding of the etiology of the disorder. Early results indicate the feasibility and potential power of GWAS to identify biomarkers for anxiety-related behaviors that suggest a future of PTSD. These studies will lead to the discovery of novel loci for the susceptibility and symptomatology of anxiety disorders including PTSD.

Epigenetics 
Genetic and environmental studies alone fail to explain the importance the developmental stressor timing exposure to the phenotypic changes associated with PTSD. Epigenetic modification is the environmentally induced change in DNA that alters the function rather than the structure of the gene. The biological mechanism of epigenetic modification typically involves the methylation of cytosine within a gene that produces decreased transcription of that segment of DNA. The neuroendocrine alteration seen in animal models parallel those of PTSD in which low basal cortisol and enhanced suppression of cortisol in response to synthetic glucocorticoid becomes hereditary. Lower levels of glucocorticoid receptor (GR) mRNA have been demonstrated in the hippocampus of suicide victims with histories of childhood abuse. It has not been possible to monitor the state of methylation over time, however the interpretation is early developmental methylation changes are long-lasting and enduring. It is hypothesized that epigenetic-mediated changes in the HPA axis could be associated with an increased vulnerability to PTSD following traumatic events. These findings support the mechanism in which early life trauma strongly validates as a risk factor for PTSD development in adulthood by recalibrating the set point and stress-responsivity of the HPA axis. Studies have reported an increased risk for PTSD and low cortisol levels in the offspring of female holocaust survivors with PTSD. Epigenetic mechanisms may also be relevant to the intrauterine environment. Mothers with PTSD produced infants with lower salivary cortisol levels only if the traumatic exposure occurred during the third trimester of gestation. These changes occur via transmission of hormonal responses to the fetus leading to a reprogramming of the glucocorticoid responsivity in the offspring.

Evolutionary psychology 
Evolutionary psychology views different types of fears and reactions caused by fears as adaptations that may have been useful in the ancestral environment in order to avoid or cope with various threats. In general, mammals display several defensive behaviors roughly dependent on how close the threat is: avoidance, vigilant immobility, withdrawal, aggressive defense, appeasement, and finally complete frozen immobility (the last possibly to confuse a predator's attack reflex or to simulate a dead and contaminated body). PTSD may correspond to and be caused by overactivation of such fear circuits. Thus, PTSD avoidance behaviors may correspond to mammal avoidance of and withdrawal from threats. Heightened memory of past threats may increase avoidance of similar situations in the future as well as be a prerequisite for analyzing the past threat and develop better defensive behaviors if the threat should recur. PTSD hyperarousal may correspond to vigilant immobility and aggressive defense. Complex post-traumatic stress disorder (and phenomena such as the Stockholm syndrome) may in part correspond to the appeasement stage and possibly the frozen immobility stage.

There may be evolutionary explanations for differences in resilience to traumatic events. Thus, PTSD is rare following traumatic fire that may be explained by events such as forest fires' long being part of the evolutionary history of mammals. On the other hand, PTSD is much more common following modern warfare, which may be explained by modern warfare's being a new development and very unlike the quick inter-group raids that are argued to have characterized the paleolithic.

References

Genetics
Post-traumatic stress disorder